Rhinoecius is a genus of mites in the family Rhinonyssidae. There are about 12 described species in Rhinoecius.

Species
These 12 species belong to the genus Rhinoecius:

 Rhinoecius aegolii Butenko, 1971
 Rhinoecius africanus (Zumpt & Patterson, 1951)
 Rhinoecius alifanovi Butenko, 1976
 Rhinoecius bisetosus Strandtmann, 1952
 Rhinoecius brikinboricus Butenko, 1976
 Rhinoecius cavannus Wilson, 1968
 Rhinoecius cooremani Strandtmann, 1952
 Rhinoecius grandis Strandtmann, 1952
 Rhinoecius nycteae Butenko, 1976
 Rhinoecius oti Cooreman, 1946
 Rhinoecius subbisetosus Bregetova, 1965
 Rhinoecius tytonis Fain, 1956

References

Acari genera
Rhinonyssidae
Articles created by Qbugbot